Koun-Fao is a town in eastern Ivory Coast. It is a sub-prefecture of and the seat of Koun-Fao Department in Gontougo Region, Zanzan District. Koun-Fao is also a commune.

In 2014, the population of the sub-prefecture of Koun-Fao was 31,982.

Villages
The twenty nine villages of the sub-prefecture of Koun-Fao and their population in 2014 are:

Notes

Sub-prefectures of Gontougo
Communes of Gontougo